Blofield Heath is a hamlet in the civil parish of Blofield, in the Broadland district, in the county of Norfolk, England. It is about 7 miles from Norwich. In 2020 it had an estimated population of 1488. Blofield Heath has a post office and Indian restaurant called the Tamarind Blofield, it formerly had a primitive Methodist Chapel. Blofield Heath is separated from Blofield village by the A47.

References

External links 

 

Hamlets in Norfolk
Broadland